The Left-Green Movement, officially the Left Movement – Green Candidature and also known by its short-form name Vinstri græn (VG), is an eco-socialist political party in Iceland.

The Left-Green Movement is the third largest party in the Althing, with 8 members of 63 in total after the 2021 Icelandic parliamentary election. It is also the leading party in a three-party coalition government that has governed since the 2017 Icelandic parliamentary election. The party chair is Katrín Jakobsdóttir, a member of Parliament and the 28th prime minister of Iceland since 30 November 2017. The vice chairperson is Guðmundur Ingi Guðbrandsson while the secretary-general of the party is Björg Eva Erlendsdóttir.

The Left-Green Movement is a member of the Nordic Green Left Alliance.

History 
The party was founded in 1999 by members of Althing who did not approve of the merger of left-wing political parties in Iceland which resulted in the formation of the Social Democratic Alliance.

In the 1999 Icelandic parliamentary election, the Left-Green Movement took 9.1% of the vote and six seats in the Althing. The party had five members in the 63-seat Icelandic parliament after the 2003 Icelandic parliamentary election, where it polled 8.8% of the vote. After the 2007 Icelandic parliamentary election, the party had 9 seats in parliament, having received 14.3% of the vote.

After the 2009 Icelandic parliamentary election, the Left-Green Movement joined the first cabinet of Jóhanna Sigurðardóttir as the minor partner to the centre-left Social Democratic Alliance after the previous coalition government of the Alliance and the centre-right Independence Party collapsed. In the 2009 Icelandic parliamentary election, it rose from 9 seats to 14, becoming Iceland's third-largest party (close behind the Independence Party) with 21.7% of the vote, the second largest outcome of a left-wing party in Iceland after the post-communist People's Alliance in 1978, when it got 22.9% of the vote. The party gained one seat in addition, when a non-party parliamentarian joined the party. Later, three members of the parliamentary group have left the party. One joined the Nordic agrarian Progressive Party and two others became non-partisans. After the 2013 Icelandic parliamentary election, the party was in the opposition and had 7 seats in the parliament. In the 2016 Icelandic parliamentary election, the party polled 15.9% of the vote and 10 seats in the Althing, becoming the second largest party, tied with the Pirates, after the Independence Party. However, after the collapse of the coalition government and snap parliamentary elections in 2017, the party increased its seats in parliament to 11 and became the second-largest party, forming a three-party coalition with the Independence Party and Progressive Party, and party chair Katrín Jakobsdóttir became the prime minister. The party lost a single seat in the 2021 parliamentary elections, but stayed in government. After the 2021 parliamentary election, the new government was, just like the previous government, a tri-party coalition of the Independence Party, the Progressive Party and the Left-Green Movement, headed by Prime Minister Katrín Jakobsdóttir.

Ideology 
The Left-Green Movement focuses on democratic socialist values, feminism, and environmentalism, as well as increased democracy and direct involvement of the people in the administration of the country. The party opposes Iceland's involvement in NATO, and also the American invasion and occupation of Iraq and Afghanistan. The party rejects membership of the European Union, and supports the Palestinian cause in the Middle East. It supports the mutual adaptation and integration of immigrants into Icelandic society as necessary.

Electoral results

Leadership

Members of Parliament 
Since the elections in 2017, the Left-Green Movement has eleven members of parliament.

References

External links 
 Official website
 The Left-Green Movement page at the Nordic Green Left Alliance website

1999 establishments in Iceland
Political parties established in 1999
Eurosceptic parties in Iceland
 
Left-wing parties
Ecosocialist parties
Environmentalism in Iceland
Feminist political parties in Iceland
Nordic Green Left Alliance
Opposition to NATO
Pacifism in Europe
Pacifist parties
Secularism in Iceland
Socialist parties in Iceland
Centre-left parties in Europe